Hajjilar Rural District was in Chaypareh District of Khoy County, West Azerbaijan province, Iran. At the National Census of 2006, its population was 8,856 in 1,953 households. Chaypareh District was separated from the county, established as Chaypareh County, and divided into two districts: the Central and Hajjilar Districts, the latter of which was the successor to Hajjilar Rural District and divided into Hajjilar-e Jonubi and Hajjilar-e Shomali Rural Districts in the newly established county.

References 

Khoy County

Rural Districts of West Azerbaijan Province

Populated places in West Azerbaijan Province

Populated places in Khoy County